Algernonia leandrii is a species of tree endemic to Brazil. It goes by the common name cega-bobo in Portuguese.

The tree can grow up to 15 meters in height.

References 

Euphorbioideae